Melam (N2-(4,6-diamino-1,3,5-triazin-2-yl)-1,3,5-triazine-2,4,6-triamine) is a condensation product of melamine.

Synthesis
Melam was discovered by Liebig in 1834 from the residue of heating ammonium thiocyanate.

Chemical property
In the presence of 30% ammonia, melam undergoes hydrolysis to form ammeline and melamine.  It also reacts with concentrated nitric acid, producing cyanuric acid.

Upon heating, melam first loses ammonia to form melem, and then melon.

References
 B. Bann and S.A. Miller, "Melamines and derivatives of melamine", Chemical Reviews, vol.58, p131-172 (1958).

Triazines
Secondary amines
Polyamines